87.5 FM is the first useable radio broadcast frequency on the FM radio band spanning between 87.5 and 108 FM or VHF Band 2. The use of 87.5 FM as the main carrier frequency of a legally established and licensed radio station is rare in most countries as it transmits signals slightly off band down to roughly 87.3 and possibly as low as 87.2 FM.

In the United Kingdom, radio station broadcasts on 87.5 FM are likely pirate radio stations as there are no known radio broadcasting licenses that are allocated to 87.5 FM (within the United Kingdom). There are a few licenses for 87.6 FM, however, most transmit on 87.7 FM and upwards. 

Stations listed so far that use 87.5 FM are:

Antarctica
KOLD at South Pole Station.

Argentina 
 Cadena Tropical in Santa Fe de la Vera Cruz, Santa Fe 
 FM Grand Bourg in Grand Bourg, Buenos Aires
 FM Soldados in Buenos Aires
 Radio El Palomar, in Banda del Río Salí, Tucumán

Brazil
In Brazil, the frequency 87.5 FM is one of the frequencies reserved for community radio stations. These stations have power limited to up to 25 watts and coverage limited to a radius of up to 1 km.

China 
 CNR Business Radio in Xiamen
 CNR China Traffic Radio in Hangzhou, Nantong, and Wuxi

Greece 
 Kriti FM in Athens
 Skyline FM in Korinthos
 Radio Amore at Iraklio

Guatemala 
 Así Fue Mi Vida

Philippines 
 DWFO in Metro Manila: Began test broadcast from November 1, 2017. The Philippine Broadcasting Service had long been desiring to use the frequency for an FM station in the area. Prior to PBS's acquisition, the Kapisanan ng mga Brodkaster ng Pilipinas asked the National Telecommunications Commission to reserve this frequency to local campuses due to multiple reports that others would use it for commercial purposes.
 DXQQ in Davao City

Spain 
 TKO FM 87.5 Costa Blanca

Taiwan 
 Transfers CNR Business Radio in Kinmen

References 

Lists of radio stations by frequency